SM UB-3 was a German Type UB I submarine or U-boat in the German Imperial Navy during World War I. She disappeared on her first patrol in May 1915, and was the first of her class to be lost.

UB-3 was ordered in October 1914 and was laid down at the Germaniawerft shipyard in Kiel in November. She carried two torpedoes for her two bow torpedo tubes and was also armed with a deck-mounted machine gun. She was launched and commissioned as SM UB-3 in March 1915.

UB-3 was broken into sections and shipped by rail to the Austro-Hungarian port of Pola in April for reassembly. She officially joined the Pola Flotilla on 1 May and departed on her first patrol for temporary duty in Turkey on 23 May, and was never seen again. A postwar German study concluded that UB-3 was likely the victim of an unexplained technical problem in the absence of any minefields or enemy action.

Design and construction 
After the German Army's rapid advance along the North Sea coast in the earliest stages of World War I, the German Imperial Navy found itself without suitable submarines that could be operated in the narrow and shallow environment off Flanders. Project 34, a design effort begun in mid-August 1914, produced the Type UB I design: a small submarine that could be shipped by rail to a port of operations and quickly assembled. UB-3 was part of the initial allotment of eight submarines—numbered  to —ordered on 15 October from Germaniawerft of Kiel, just shy of two months after planning for the class began.

UB-3 was laid down by Germaniawerft on 3 November and was launched on 5 March 1915. She had a single  Daimler 4-cylinder diesel engine for surface travel, and a single  Siemens-Schuckert electric motor for underwater travel, both attached to a single propeller shaft.

UB-3 was armed with two  torpedoes in two bow torpedo tubes. She was also outfitted for a single  machine gun on deck. UB-3s complement consisted of one officer and thirteen enlisted men.

Service career 
The submarine was commissioned into the German Imperial Navy as SM UB-3 on 14 March under the command of Oberleutnant zur See Siegfried Schmidt, a 27-year-old, first-time U-boat skipper, and underwent trials in German home waters.

As one of the UB I boats selected for Mediterranean duty, UB-3 was readied for rail shipment. The process of shipping a UB I boat involved breaking the submarine down into what was essentially a knock down kit. Each boat was broken into approximately fifteen pieces and loaded onto eight railway flatcars. UB-3 was shipped to the port of Pola, site of ally Austria-Hungary's main naval base, on 15 April. After UB-3s parts arrived at Pola, it took about two weeks to assemble them. UB-3 joined the Pola Flotilla on 1 May.

By late May, UB-3 had made her way down the Adriatic to the Austro–Hungarian port of Cattaro, the base from which most boats of the Pola Flotilla actually operated. For her first patrol, UB-3 was loaded with ammunition for Turkish forces at İzmir, Turkey. Because of her limited range, UB-3 was towed by the light cruiser SMS Novara of the Austro-Hungarian Navy through the Straits of Otranto and cast off near the island of Kérkira. UB-3s planned route was south of the Ionian Islands, around the Peloponnese, through the Cyclades, north around Khios and Karaburun, and into the Gulf of İzmir. If all went well, UB-3 would have arrived at İzmir on 28 or 29 May with about half her fuel left. No trace of UB-3 has ever been found. UB-3 was the first of the UB I boats to be lost during the war.

A postwar German study concluded that UB-3s loss was probably the result of some unexplained technical problem, because there were no minefields along UB-3s route and no record of any attacks against U-boats in the area. They also point out that UB-3 had gone missing nearly a year before UB-3s supposed sinking in the North Sea.

Notes

References

Bibliography 

 

 
 
 
 
 
 
 
 
 

German Type UB I submarines
Ships built in Kiel
1915 ships
U-boats commissioned in 1915
World War I submarines of Germany
Maritime incidents in 1915
U-boats sunk in 1915
World War I shipwrecks in the Aegean Sea
Ships lost with all hands